Calliotropis is a genus of sea snails, marine gastropod mollusks in the family Eucyclidae.

Taxonomy 
According to the taxonomy of the Gastropoda by Bouchet & Rocroi, 2005) the genus Calliotropis is placed in the subfamily Calliotropinae within the family Chilodontidae.

New insights into the taxonomy of the Seguenzioidea were provided by Kano (2007).

Description
The size of the shell of species in this genus is small to moderate. The iridescent shell is thin and contains a conspicuous umbilicus. Its sculpture shows spiral rows with many tubercles.

The shells resemble Solariella, but differ in the radula, which is longer, with a larger number of uncini. The teeth of the median part are less denticulated.

Species
Species within the genus Calliotropis include:

Calliotropis abyssicola Rehder & Ladd, 1973
 Calliotropis achantodes Vilvens, 2020
Calliotropis acherontis Marshall, 1979
Calliotropis actinophora (Dall, 1890)
Calliotropis aeglees (Watson, 1879)
 † Calliotropis aliabadensis Nützel & Senowbari-Daryan, 1999 
Calliotropis ambigua (Dautzenberg & Fischer, 1896)
Calliotropis ammos Vilvens, 2012 
 Calliotropis andamanensis Hickman, 2016
Calliotropis annonaformis Lee Y.C. & Wu W.L., 2001
Calliotropis antarctica Dall, 1990
 † Calliotropis arenosa Helwerda, Wesselingh & S. T. Williams, 2014 
Calliotropis asphales Vilvens, 2007
Calliotropis babylonia Vilvens, 2006
Calliotropis basileus Vilvens, 2004
 † Calliotropis biarmata (Münster, 1844) 
Calliotropis bicarinata (Schepman, 1908)
Calliotropis blacki Marshall, 1979
Calliotropis boucheti Poppe, Tagaro & Dekker, 2006
Calliotropis bucina Vilvens, 2006
 Calliotropis bukabukaensis Hickman, 2016
Calliotropis calatha (Dall, 1927)
Calliotropis calcarata (Schepman, 1908)
Calliotropis canaliculata Jansen, 1994
Calliotropis carinata Jansen, 1994
Calliotropis carlotta (Dall, 1902)
Calliotropis ceciliae Vilvens & Sellanes, 2010
Calliotropis ceratophora (Dall, 1896)
 † Calliotropis chatticus Lozouet, 1999 
 Calliotropis chrypte Vilvens, 2020
 Calliotropis chunfuleei Chino, 2014
Calliotropis chenoderma Barnard, 1963
Calliotropis chuni (Martens, 1904)
Calliotropis concavospira (Schepman, 1908)
Calliotropis conoeides Vilvens, 2007
Calliotropis cooperculum Vilvens, 2007
Calliotropis coopertorium Vilvens, 2007
Calliotropis crystalophora Marshall, 1979
Calliotropis cycloeides Vilvens, 2007
Calliotropis cynee Vilvens, 2007
Calliotropis delli Marshall, 1979
Calliotropis dentata Quinn, 1991
Calliotropis denticulus Vilvens, 2007
Calliotropis derbiosa Vilvens, 2004
Calliotropis dicrous Vilvens, 2007
Calliotropis echidna Jansen, 1994
Calliotropis echidnoides Vilvens, 2007
Calliotropis effossima (Locard, 1898)
Calliotropis elephas Vilvens, 2007
Calliotropis eltanini Dell, 1990
 Calliotropis enantioserrata Hickman, 2016
Calliotropis equatorialis (Dall, 1896)
Calliotropis eucheloides Marshall, 1979
Calliotropis excelsior Vilvens, 2004
 † Calliotropis faustiankensis Ferrari & Kaim, 2018 
Calliotropis francocacii Poppe, Tagaro & Dekker, 2006
Calliotropis galea (Habe, 1953)
Calliotropis gemmulosa (Adams, 1860)
Calliotropis globosa Quinn, 1991
Calliotropis glypta (Watson, 1879)
Calliotropis granolirata (Sowerby, 1903)
Calliotropis grata Thiele, 1925
Calliotropis hataii Rehder & Ladd, 1973
Calliotropis helix Vilvens, 2007
Calliotropis hondoensis (Dall, 1919)
 † Calliotropis hutchinsoniana (Laws, 1939) 
Calliotropis hysterea Vilvens, 2007
Calliotropis infundibulum (Watson, 1879)
Calliotropis keras Vilvens, 2007
 Calliotropis lamuluensis Hickman, 2016
Calliotropis lateumbilicata Dell, 1990
Calliotropis limbifera (Schepman, 1908)
Calliotropis lissocona (Dall, 1881)
 Calliotropis locolocoensis Hickman, 2016
 † Calliotropis lukovensis Ferrari & Kaim, 2018 
Calliotropis malapascuensis Poppe, Tagaro & Dekker, 2006
Calliotropis metallica (Wood-Mason & Alcock, 1891)
Calliotropis micraulax Vilvens, 2004
Calliotropis midwayensis (Lan, 1990)
Calliotropis minorusaitoi Poppe, Tagaro & Dekker, 2006
Calliotropis mogadorensis (Locard, 1898)
 Calliotropis monsyu S.-I Huang, M.-H. Lin & C.-L. Chen, 2018
 † Calliotropis motutaraensis Powell, 1935 
Calliotropis multisquamosa (Schepman, 1908)
Calliotropis muricata (Schepman, 1908)
 Calliotropis myriamae Vilvens, 2020
 † Calliotropis naybandensis Nützel & Senowbari-Daryan, 1999 
Calliotropis niasensis Thiele, 1925
Calliotropis nomisma Vilvens, 2007
Calliotropis nomismasimilis Vilvens, 2007
Calliotropis nux Vilvens, 2007
Calliotropis oregmene Vilvens, 2007
Calliotropis oros Vivens, 2007
Calliotropis ostrideslithos Vilvens, 2007
Calliotropis ottoi (Philippi, 1844)
Calliotropis pagodiformis (Schepman, 1908)
Calliotropis pataxo Absalao, 2009
Calliotropis patula (Martens, 1904)
Calliotropis pelseneeri Cernohorsky, 1977
Calliotropis persculpta (Sowerby, 1903)
Calliotropis pheidole Vilvens, 2007
Calliotropis philippei Poppe, Tagaro & Dekker, 2006
Calliotropis pistis Vilvens, 2007
Calliotropis pompe Barnard, 1963
Calliotropis powelli Marshall, 1979
 Calliotropis prionote Vilvens, 2020
Calliotropis ptykte Vilvens, 2007
Calliotropis pulchra (Schepman, 1908)
Calliotropis pulvinaris Vilvens, 2005
Calliotropis pyramoeides Vilvens, 2007
Calliotropis regalis (Verrill & Smith, 1880)
Calliotropis reticulina (Dall, 1895)
Calliotropis rhina (Watson, 1886)
Calliotropis rhysa (Watson, 1879)
 † Calliotropis rivulensis Lozouet, 1999 
Calliotropis rostrum Vilvens, 2007
Calliotropis rudecta (Locard, 1898)
Calliotropis sagarinoi Poppe, Tagaro & Dekker, 2006
Calliotropis scalaris Lee & Wu, 2001
 † Calliotropis seguris Kiel & Bandel, 2001 
 Calliotropis siopele Vilvens, 2020
Calliotropis siphaios Vilvens, 2007
Calliotropis solomonensis Vilvens, 2007
Calliotropis spinulosa (Schepman, 1908)
Calliotropis stanyi Poppe, Tagaro & Dekker, 2006
Calliotropis stegos Vilvens, 2007
 Calliotropis stethos Vilvens, 2020
Calliotropis stellaris Lee & Wu, 2001
 † Calliotropis subdisjuncta (Cossmann, 1908) 
 Calliotropis tabakaensis Hickman, 2016
Calliotropis talismani (Locard, 1898)
 Calliotropis tavmaste Vilvens, 2020
Calliotropis tiara (Watson, 1879)
 Calliotropis tominiensis Hickman, 2016
 † Calliotropis tophina P. A. Maxwell, 1992 
Calliotropis trieres Vilvens, 2007
Calliotropis vaillanti (Fischer, 1882)
Calliotropis valida (Dautzenberg & Fischer, 1906)
Calliotropis velata Vilvens, 2006
Calliotropis vilvensi Poppe, Tagaro & Dekker, 2006
Calliotropis virginiae Poppe, Tagaro & Dekker, 2006
 † Calliotropis wakefieldi Hayward, 1981 
Calliotropis wilsi Poppe, Tagaro & Dekker, 2006
 Calliotropis yapensis S.-Q. Zhang & S.-P. Zhang, 2018
Calliotropis yukikoae Poppe, Tagaro & Dekker, 2006
Calliotropis zone Vilvens, 2007

Species brought into synonymy:
Calliotropis (Calliotropis): synonym of Calliotropis L. Seguenza, 1903
Calliotropis (Solaricida) Dall, 1919 represented as Calliotropis L. Seguenza, 1903
Calliotropis ammonaformis Lee & Wu, 2001: synonym of Calliotropis annonaformis Lee & Wu, 2001
Calliotropis chalkeie Vilvens, 2007: synonym of Spinicalliotropis chalkeie (Vilvens, 2007) (original combination)
Calliotropis crystalophorus Marshall, 1979: synonym of Calliotropis crystalophora Marshall, 1979
Calliotropis ericius Vilvens, 2006: synonym of Spinicalliotropis ericius (Vilvens, 2006) (original combination)
Calliotropis lamellifera Jansen, 1994: synonym of Spinicalliotropis lamellifera (Jansen, 1994) (original combination)
Calliotropis scabriusculus (Watson, 1879): synonym of Calliotropis tiara (Watson, 1879)
Calliotropis solariellaformis Vilvens, 2006: synonym of Spinicalliotropis solariellaformis Vilvens, 2006 (original combination)
Calliotropis spinosa Poppe, Tagaro & Dekker, 2006: synonym of Spinicalliotropis spinosa

References

 Marshall B. A. (1979). The Trochidae and Turbinidae of the Kermadec Ridge (Mollusca: Gastropoda). New Zealand Journal of Zoology 6: 521–552-page(s): 530
 Vilvens C. (2012) New species and new records of Seguenzioidea and Trochoidea (Gastropoda) from French Polynesia. Novapex 13(1): 1–23. [10 March 2012] page(s): 4

External links

 
Eucyclidae
Taxa named by Rodolfo Amando Philippi